Rev. John Grady Burkhalter (July 23, 1909 - September 30, 1992) was a Baptist minister and highly decorated chaplain who served in World War II and the Korean War. He was part of the D-Day invasion of Normandy at Omaha Beach.

Early days
Burkhalter was born in Thomasville, Georgia on July 23, 1909. While an adolescent, he boxed professionally under the name "Jacky Mills," and played on the 1929 Miami High School football team. In 1935, Burkhalter was named senior pastor of the West Flagler Park Baptist Church in Miami, Florida, and married his high school sweetheart, Miss Mabel Money, the following year.

Military career

World War II
Burkhalter enlisted in the United States Army and graduated from the Chaplain's School at Harvard. In 1943, he was assigned to the 1st Infantry Division and landed on Omaha Beach on D-day. An account of his experiences was printed in the Miami Daily News on August 6, 1944. Rev Burkhalter sustained multiple head injuries due to exploding shrapnel during the Battle of the Bulge. He was declared "missing in action" for several weeks before eventually turning up in a French hospital. Burkhalter received a Purple Heart for these deeds. Burkhalter was awarded the Bronze Star for valor and America's third highest honor, The Silver Star for gallantry. His citation for the Silver Star reads as follows: "For gallantry in action in the vicinity of Haaren, Germany, 21 October 1944. Although constantly subjected to heavy artillery bombardment and several times thrown to the ground by concussion of exploding shells, Chaplain Burkhalter moved about an exposed area and directed the recovery of the bodies of American casualties. Chaplain Burkhalter's courage and coolness under fire were of great inspiration to all who witnessed his gallant deeds."

Korean War
Burkhalter also spent time with the 2nd Infantry Division and would spend a total of 20 months in the European Theater of Operations. On March 22, 1946, Burkhalter was promoted to the rank of captain and was assigned to an occupational duty in Japan. He stayed in Japan several years until the Korean War escalated. During the Korean War, he served primarily with the 51st Signal Battalion and the 73rd Tank Battalion. While serving near Kumch'on in the summer of 1950, Rev. Burkhalter gained notoriety when his name and a photograph of him conducting a funeral were published in Life Magazine. Burkhalter was promoted to major during the Korean War and would spend thirteen months in Korea. After the war, Burkhalter would serve in several different posts and entered the US Army Reserves. On July 3, 1969, Burkhalter would officially retire from the United States Army as a lieutenant colonel. Some of Burkhalter's military adventures were recorded in 2000 in the book, "Heroes to Remember" by Brandon R. Sanders.

U.S. decorations and badges

Education and pastoral ministry
Burkhalter held bachelor's degrees in history from the University of Miami and divinity from Crozer Theological Seminary in Pennsylvania. Burkhalter held a master's degree in history from Stetson University and began doctoral work at American University. He pastored several churches including West Flagler Park Baptist Church in Miami, Van Buren Street Baptist Church in Eastport (1959–1963), Berkley Baptist Church in Mount Royal, N.J. (1963–1967) and Maryland City Baptist Church in Laurel (1967–1968). He founded Temple Baptist Church (renamed Riva Community Bible Church) in Riva, Md. in 1973, and served as pastor there until 1988.

Death and burial
Burkhalter died on September 30, 1992 at the age of 83 and was buried with full military honors on Chaplain's Hill at Arlington National Cemetery. The burial was carried out by the 3rd US Infantry Regiment (The Old Guard) and included a military band, American flag draped over the coffin, horse-drawn wagon, 21-gun salute, taps, Riderless horse, etc.

References

External links

 John Burkhalter: Hero of the Cross in Korea" All Nations Review, Summer 1951, pages 6–7.
 Miami Daily News on August 6, 1944
 http://www.life.com/image/50876430

1909 births
1992 deaths
United States Army personnel of World War II
United States Army personnel of the Korean War
World War II chaplains
Korean War chaplains
Recipients of the Silver Star
United States Army chaplains
United States Army officers
20th-century Baptist ministers from the United States
United States Army reservists
University of Miami alumni
Crozer Theological Seminary alumni
Stetson University alumni
Burials at Arlington National Cemetery
Southern Baptists